Morrisville is a city in southern Polk County, Missouri, United States. The population was 388 at the 2010 census. It is part of the Springfield, Missouri Metropolitan Statistical Area.

History
Morrisville was founded in 1870 by Morris Mitchell, and named after him. A post office called Morrisville has been in operation since 1872.

Geography
Morrisville is located on Missouri Route 215 approximately 5.5 miles east of Eudora and 4.5 miles west of Brighton. The Little Sac River flows past about two miles to the southeast.

Demographics

2010 census
As of the census of 2010, there were 388 people, 153 households, and 110 families living in the city. The racial makeup of the city was 94.3% White, 1.0% African American, 0.8% Native American, 0.3% from other races, and 3.6% from two or more races. Hispanic or Latino of any race were 1.8% of the population.

There were 153 households, of which 34.0% had children under the age of 18 living with them, 55.6% were married couples living together, 9.2% had a female householder with no husband present, 7.2% had a male householder with no wife present, and 28.1% were non-families. 23.5% of all households were made up of individuals, and 8.5% had someone living alone who was 65 years of age or older. The average household size was 2.54 and the average family size was 2.97.

The median age in the city was 37.6 years. 24.7% of residents were under the age of 18; 10.1% were between the ages of 18 and 24; 24.1% were from 25 to 44; 27% were from 45 to 64; and 14.2% were 65 years of age or older. The gender makeup of the city was 50.3% male and 49.7% female.

2000 census
As of the census of 2000, there were 344 people, 130 households, and 89 families living in the town. The population density was 1,125.5 people per square mile (428.4/km2). There were 137 housing units at an average density of 448.2 per square mile (170.6/km2). The racial makeup of the town was 98.84% White, 0.29% Native American, and 0.87% from two or more races. Hispanic or Latino of any race were 2.03% of the population.

There were 130 households, out of which 36.9% had children under the age of 18 living with them, 53.1% were married couples living together, 12.3% had a female householder with no husband present, and 30.8% were non-families. 27.7% of all households were made up of individuals, and 16.9% had someone living alone who was 65 years of age or older. The average household size was 2.65 and the average family size was 3.22.

In the town the population was spread out, with 29.9% under the age of 18, 8.1% from 18 to 24, 29.4% from 25 to 44, 17.2% from 45 to 64, and 15.4% who were 65 years of age or older. The median age was 36 years. For every 100 females, there were 96.6 males. For every 100 females age 18 and over, there were 89.8 males.

The median income for a household in the town was $23,906, and the median income for a family was $30,357. Males had a median income of $22,813 versus $20,556 for females. The per capita income for the town was $11,440. About 16.3% of families and 27.9% of the population were below the poverty line, including 27.0% of those under age 18 and 37.1% of those age 65 or over.

Education
Marion C. Early R-V School District operates one elementary school, one junior high school, and Marion C. Early High School at Morrisville.

Morrisville has a public library, a branch of the Polk County Library.

Notable person
Country singer Wynn Stewart was born in Morrisville.

References

External links
 Historic maps of Morrisville in the Sanborn Maps of Missouri Collection at the University of Missouri

Cities in Polk County, Missouri
Springfield metropolitan area, Missouri
Cities in Missouri